Aadab Arz is a Bollywood film directed by V. C. Desai. It was released in 1943. It was produced by "Amar Pictures" which was a company started by Chimanlal Desai after he left National Studios. The film starred Nalini Jaywant, Karan Dewan, Mukesh, and Dulari. The music was composed by Gyan Dutt and the lyricists were Rammurti Chaturvedi, Pandit Indra and Kailash Matwala.

References

External links

1943 films
1940s Hindi-language films
Indian black-and-white films